Shoshone is a census designated place (CDP) in Inyo County, California, United States. The population was 22 at the 2020 census, down from 31 at the 2010 census.

The town was founded in 1910. Although small, it is notable as a southern gateway to Death Valley National Park; in addition to being a junction of roads leading from Baker, California and Pahrump, Nevada, it has the last services available before the Furnace Creek area in the park. The commercial district of the town, including a post office, gas station, restaurant, bar and coffee house, is just north of the southern intersection of California State Routes 127 and 178.

Shoshone has a single 2,380 foot (725 m) airstrip across SR 127 from the commercial district.  It is open to the public and gets about 58 flights per month.

Shoshone, California, has a history as a railroad town and rich mining district.

Geography

Shoshone is at the junction of California State Route 127 and California State Route 178.

Climate
According to the Köppen Climate Classification system, Shoshone has a hot desert climate, abbreviated "BWh" on climate maps.

History
Shoshone was founded in 1910 by Ralph Jacobus "Dad" Fairbanks, a Death Valley businessman.
 The town remains owned by his descendants. A post office operated at Shoshone from 1915, closed for part of 1920.
Shoshone was a stop on the Tonopah and Tidewater Railroad which shut down in 1940.

Demographics

2010
The 2010 United States Census reported that Shoshone had a population of 31. The population density was 1.1 people per square mile (0.4/km). The racial makeup of Shoshone was 28 (90.3%) White, 1 (3.2%) African American, 1 (3.2%) Native American, 0 (0.0%) Asian, 0 (0.0%) Pacific Islander, 0 (0.0%) from other races, and 1 (3.2%) from two or more races.  Hispanic or Latino of any race were 0 persons (0.0%).

The Census reported that 31 people (100% of the population) lived in households, 0 (0%) lived in non-institutionalized group quarters, and 0 (0%) were institutionalized.

There were 17 households, out of which 2 (11.8%) had children under the age of 18 living in them, 4 (23.5%) were opposite-sex married couples living together, 2 (11.8%) had a female householder with no husband present, 0 (0%) had a male householder with no wife present.  There were 4 (23.5%) unmarried opposite-sex partnerships, and 0 (0%) same-sex married couples or partnerships. 6 households (35.3%) were made up of individuals, and 4 (23.5%) had someone living alone who was 65 years of age or older. The average household size was 1.82.  There were 6 families (35.3% of all households); the average family size was 2.50.

The population was spread out, with 3 people (9.7%) under the age of 18, 0 people (0%) aged 18 to 24, 13 people (41.9%) aged 25 to 44, 10 people (32.3%) aged 45 to 64, and 5 people (16.1%) who were 65 years of age or older.  The median age was 44.5 years. For every 100 females, there were 93.8 males.  For every 100 females age 18 and over, there were 100.0 males.

There were 31 housing units at an average density of 1.1 per square mile (0.4/km), of which 17 were occupied, of which 5 (29.4%) were owner-occupied, and 12 (70.6%) were occupied by renters. The homeowner vacancy rate was 16.7%; the rental vacancy rate was 20.0%.  9 people (29.0% of the population) lived in owner-occupied housing units and 22 people (71.0%) lived in rental housing units.

2000
As of the census of 2000, there were 52 people, 26 households, and 17 families residing in the CDP. The population density was 1.8 people per square mile (0.7/km). There were 34 housing units at an average density of 1.2 per square mile (0.5/km). The racial makeup of the CDP was 88.46% White, 5.77% Native American, and 5.77% from two or more races. 7.69% of the population were Hispanic or Latino of any race.

There were 26 households, out of which 15.4% had children under the age of 18 living with them, 53.8% were married couples living together, 11.5% had a female householder with no husband present, and 30.8% were non-families. 26.9% of all households were made up of individuals, and 11.5% had someone living alone who was 65 years of age or older. The average household size was 2.00 and the average family size was 2.22.

In the CDP, the population was spread out, with 11.5% under the age of 18, 21.2% from 25 to 44, 28.8% from 45 to 64, and 38.5% who were 65 years of age or older. The median age was 56 years. For every 100 females, there were 85.7 males. For every 100 females age 18 and over, there were 76.9 males.

The median income for a household in the CDP was $66,250, and the median income for a family was $61,750. Males had a median income of $31,406 versus $41,500 for females. The per capita income for the CDP was $27,051. There were no families and 4.8% of the population living below the poverty line, including no one under 18 and no one over 64.

Government

References

External links

 Shoshone Village Website
 Landing at Shoshone Airport
 The Shoshone Museum, Shoshone, CA
 Amargosa Conservancy, Shoshone, CA
 Death Valley Lodging

Populated places in the Mojave Desert
Census-designated places in Inyo County, California
Tonopah and Tidewater Railroad
Census-designated places in California